The Goya Award for Best Ibero-American Film, formerly the Goya Award for Best Spanish Language Foreign Film (1987–2008) and the Goya Award for Best Hispanic American Film (2009–2010), is one of the Goya Awards, Spain's principal national film awards. The category has been presented ever since the first edition of the Goya Awards with the exception of the third edition where it was not awarded. Carlos Sorín's A King and His Movie was the first winner of this award representing Argentina.

Winners and nominees

Argentina has received the most awards and nominations in this category with 19 wins and 29 nominations, Chile follows the most wins with 5 while Mexico follows the most nominations with 21. Goya winning films The Secret in Their Eyes (2009), A Fantastic Woman (2017) and Roma (2018) have won the Academy Award for Best Foreign Language Film representing Argentina, Chile and Mexico respectively, with the latter also being nominated for Best Picture and winning Best Director.

Argentine director Eduardo Mignogna is the most awarded director in this category, winning for Autumn Sun (1996), The Lighthouse (1998) and La fuga (2001), while the most nominated directors in this category are Peruvian director Francisco José Lombardi, nominated for Fallen from Heaven (1990), Without Compassion (1994), Captain Pantoja and the Special Services (2000) and Black Butterfly (2007) and Chilean director Andrés Wood, nominated for Machuca (2004), The Good Life (2008), Violeta Went to Heaven (2011) and Spider (2019), with four nominations each.

Notes:
 The winner in each year is shown with a blue background and in bold.
 † – indicates the winner of the Academy Award for Best Foreign Language Film.
 ‡ – indicates a nominee that was nominated for the Academy Award for Best Foreign Language Film

1980s

1990s

2000s

2010s

2020s

Awards by country

References

External links

IMDb: Goya Awards

Spanish language foreign film
Awards for best film
Ibero-American awards